Humphrey Moseley (by 1526 – 4 July 1592) was an English politician.

Life
Moseley was the second son of Nicholas and Elizabeth Moseley, and married Margaret Heigham, daughter of the MP Clement Heigham. They had four sons and at least one daughter.

Career
Moseley was a Member of Parliament for Marlborough in 1547, Mitchell in March 1553, Aylesbury in April 1554, Gatton in 1555, and Wootton Bassett in 1558 and 1559.

References

1592 deaths
Members of the pre-1707 English Parliament for constituencies in Cornwall
English MPs 1547–1552
English MPs 1553 (Edward VI)
English MPs 1554
English MPs 1555
English MPs 1558
English MPs 1559
Year of birth uncertain